Little India (Tamil: குட்டி  இந்தியா) is an ethnic Indian enclave located in the city of George Town, Penang. The oldest Hindu temple in Penang, Sri Mahamariamman Temple is located here.

Economy

The Little India is also main business district in Georgetown, Penang. Various Indian related business can be found here. Although, majority of business here were owned by the Indian there also small number of Chinese owned shop.  There are many Indian fashion store (Mainly in Market Street), they sell mostly saree, silk and cotton, almost anything that has the essence of India. Traditional costumes, spices, precious gold and costume jewelry which use semi-precious gems are widely sales by the most of the shops. There also large number of restaurant and cafe which sales Indian culinary and western foods. There are also music video stores with the latest Bollywood movies and songs.

Education
Sentral College Penang located in the Little India Zone. The hostel of Penang Disted College, Disted Space also located in the zone. Meanwhile, SEGi College Penang located at Greenhall, which is just a walking distance from Little India.

Further reading
 Ooi Cheng Ghee. Portraits of Penang: Little India. George Town, Penang: Areca Books. (2011).

See also
 Brickfields
 Little India, Malacca
 Paya Besar
 Little India, Ipoh
 Little India, Singapore

References

George Town, Penang
Little Indias
Populated places in Penang
Indian diaspora in Malaysia
Ethnic enclaves in Malaysia